Cunz is a surname. Notable people with the surname include:

 Curtis Cunz, American rugby league player and team owner
 Dieter Cunz (1910–1969), German émigré professor of German language and literature
 Martha Cunz (1876–1961), Swiss printmaker

See also
 Bunz (disambiguation)
 Munz